Turkmen registration plates were first issued in 1980, when the country was still a Soviet republic. Although it had become a sovereign state in 1991, Turkmenistan continued to use Soviet plates until the introduction of the current format in 1994 – a phenomenon also observed in Kyrgyzstan.

Previous series 
Between 1980 and 1993, Turkmen registration plates were manufactured in accordance with the Soviet GOST 3207-77 standard. The alphanumeric sequence took the form of: x #### XX, where x is a lowercase Cyrillic serial/counter letter; # is any digit in the range 0-9; and XX are two uppercase Cyrillic letters indicating where the vehicle was first registered.

Region identifiers

Current series 

1994 saw the introduction of the current format, which is intended to comply more closely with international norms. Major changes include the switch from Cyrillic letters to Latin, and the presence of the Turkmen flag with the two-letter country code TM on the left of the plate. Unusually, the alphanumerics are rendered in a mix of DIN 1451 and the unnamed font formerly used on French registration plates. The current format is: XX 99 99 XX while the last two letters is based on geographic location.

Trailers

Province identifiers

Special series

Diplomatic 
Diplomatic plates are blue with white characters (rendered in DIN 1451) of the form ## CD ### – where # is any digit in the range 0–9. The first two digits indicate the embassy to whom the vehicle belongs, whilst the remaining three are serial numbers. The Turkmen flag appears to the left of the plate, above the letters 'TM'.

Foreign national 
Plates issued to foreign nationals or companies residing in Turkmenistan resemble closely those found in Azerbaijan. They feature black alphanumerics rendered in DIN 1451 on a yellow background, and take the form of: #H ##### (e.g. 2H 50035).

Foreign trailers
They feature black alphanumerics rendered in DIN 1451 on a yellow background, and take the form of: #HT ### (e.g. 2HT 5035).

Export

Government 
Government plates are green with silver characters arranged in the following format: ## ## XXX – where # is any digit between 0 and 9, and X is a letter from the Latin alphabet. An example of a governmental plate issued in the capital, Ashkhabad, would look like this: 00 33 AGA. Unusually, all the characters are rendered in the typeface formerly used on French registration plates.

Military

Ceremony

References 

Turkmenistan
Transport in Turkmenistan